Admiral M Shaheen Iqbal, NBP, NUP, ndc, afwc, psc is the four star Admiral of the Bangladesh Navy who is currently serving as the Chief of the Naval Staff. Previously he held the posts of Assistant Chief of Naval Staff Operations & Assistant Chief of Naval Staff Personnel in Naval Headquarters.

Early life and education 
In his long career, Admiral Shaheen   has attained extensive education and training in military strategies, combat and tactics both at home and abroad. Some of his major courses include "International Surface Warfare Course" in the United States, "Officers Weapon & Tactics Course" with Bangladesh Army and specialized on "Anti-Submarine Warfare" from India. He is a graduate of "Naval Staff College", United States. Later, he completed "Armed Forces War Course" (AFWC), "National Defence Course" (NDC) and Capstone Course from National Defence College (Bangladesh). He has also successfully completed "Combined Force Maritime Component Commander Flag Officers Course" (CFMCC) in the United States.

Naval career 
The Admiral, has served in different capacities at different Navy. He is a passionate seafarer, proved himself worthy of being entrusted with the command responsibilities from the very early stage of his career in the Navy. He has successfully commanded ships of all sizes including Frigates, Offshore Patrol Vessel (OPV), Large Patrol Craft (LPC), Minesweeper, Patrol Craft (PC), Fast Attack Crafts including - Missile and Torpedo Boats. He has also held Navy's top command posts as Assistant Chief of Naval Staff (Operations), Assistant Chief of Naval Staff (Personnel), Commander Chattogram Naval Area (COMCHIT), Commodore Commanding Khulna (COMKHUL) as well as commanded major administrative and training bases including BNS TITUMIR and School of Maritime Warfare and Tactics (SMWT). Besides, he has served as Director Naval Operations (DNO) and Director Naval Intelligence (DNI) at the Naval Headquarters. Additionally, he was also appointed as Director, National Security Intelligence (NSI), where he successfully fulfilled a number of important national responsibilities.

Contribution

Bhasan Char project for Rohingyas 

Iqbal played a key role in the implementation of the Bhasan Char project for the resettlement of the forcibly displaced Myanmar citizens in 2017 under the direction of Prime Minister Sheikh Hasina. He played a special role in the planning, supervision and implementation of the project with the Prime Minister's Office and the concerned ministries. In just 10 months of launching the project as directed by the Prime Minister, he earned the admiration of all quarters by making a remote island livable for one lakh Rohingyas.

Maritime boundary standoff 

In his working life,  M Shaheen Iqbal made special contribution in various important national affairs. During his tenure as Regional Commander of the Khulna Naval Area in 2013, he worked with an international team of judges and analysts to determine the maritime boundaries between Bangladesh and India and ensure their safety.Besides, he also played a significant role in facilitating the overall visit of the Permanent Court of Arbitration (PCA) delegation regarding maritime boundary delimitation in 2013.

UN Mission 
Admiral Shaheen has extensively represented Bangladesh Navy (BN) overseas, including several international seminars. He led many high-level operational and training delegations. He has also led the BN delegation during several international naval exercises and headed the BN team during the ship acceptance of Corvettes and Frigates. He is a proud "Blue Flag" bearer as a member of the UN in Iraq.

Awards 
Admiral received numerous Commendations from the Chief of Naval Staff and Administrative Authorities in recognition of his outstanding professional excellence in Bangladesh Navy. He was adorned with the highest achievement awards in Navy namely “Nou Bahini Padak” (NBP)- for outstanding contribution for BN development, “Nou Utkorsho Padak” (NUP) – for his outstanding academic and professional course performance.

Family 
Admiral Shaheen Iqbal is married to Mrs Monira Rowshan Akhter, who is serving as president, Bangladesh Navy Family Welfare Association and Ladies Club. Their only son Muntasir Mamun Iqbal, is presently serving as Director (Institutional Ranking Cell) & Senior Lecturer in the Department of Economics at North South University and his wife, Nabila Hossain Purno, as a Programme Analyst at UNFPA. Admiral Shaheen Iqbal is fond of travelling, gardening and reading books. He appreciates good music and enjoys golf and tennis.

See also
 List of serving admirals of the Bangladesh Navy
 Chief of Naval Staff (Bangladesh)

References

External links 
 Official Biography of M Shaheen Iqbal. Bangladesh Navy.
 Vice Admiral M Shaheen Iqbal takes charge of Bangladesh Navy
 Bangladesh names Shaheen Iqbal as new Navy chief

Chiefs of Naval Staff (Bangladesh)
Bangladeshi Navy admirals
Bangladesh Navy
Living people
Bangladesh Navy personnel
1964 births
National Defence College (Bangladesh) alumni